Teen-Age Romances was an American romance comic series produced by St. John Publications. Each issue was a series of one-shot stories involving a wide cast of characters. The first three issues began with a standard format of five stories each, and then it branched out to various larger numbers.

Publication history
Teen-Age Romances, one of a late-1940s spate of romance comics, ran 45 issues, cover-dated January 1949 to December 1955.  Released by St. John Publications, with at least two issues published under that publisher's Approved Comics imprint, it included among its artists Lily Renée and Matt Baker. Many stories were written by Dana Dutch.

Issues #4-8 (Aug. 1949 - Feb. 1950) carried photographic covers, and issues #26-30 (Nov. 1952 - March 1953) used painted covers, rather than standard penciled-and-inked drawn covers.

Stories
The titles of the various stories include:

1949
January (Too Young for Love?)
They Called Me a Wayward Girl
Too Many Dates Were My Downfall
Was I Too Young for Love?
I Played Hide and Seek with Love
I Spelled Ki$$e$ the Wrong Way
April (no title)
I Dared to Kiss and Tell
We Couldn't Be Kept Apart
They Made Me a Cinderella
How Could I Fight Temptation?
I Took the Wrong Road to Romance
July (I Was Afraid to Fall in Love)
I Didn't Want a Stepfather
I Was Afraid to Fall in Love
Did I Give My Love Too Freely?
Stand-In for Scandal
Spitework Was My Folly
August (I couldn't give up my SECRET LOVE)
Moonlight Escapade
Never Gamble on a Lie
You're What the Boys Like
Does Necking Increase a Girl's Popularity?
Hollywood Pin-Ups - Peter Lawford
They Called Me a Love Thief
Pleasure Boat
Mopsy ["Beside the regular sales tax, there's an amusement tax on that model!"]
Phony Love Affair
I Couldn't Give Up My Secret Love
I'll Not Date in August
Short Cuts to Glamour
Platter Chatter
Step Out, Please!
Movie Previews
September (I was a HOLLYWOOD CINDERELLA)
Come-On Girl
I Was a Hollywood Cinderella
My One Little Mistake
Love Is Born
Rival in Love
Platter Chatter
Brushes to Beauty
October (I was Caught Stealing Kisses)
Flame of Youth
It Doesn't Pay to Steal Kisses
Rx for a Broken Heart
Was I a Fool to Go On Loving Him?
I Lived a Lie
Was I Really a Bad Girl?
November (I RAN AWAY FROM HOME)
I Ran Away from Home
Reputation at Stake
Suspicion Nearly Killed My Love
The Love Bargain I Couldn't Keep

References

Comics magazines published in the United States
1949 comics debuts
1955 comics endings
Defunct American comics
Romance comics
Magazines established in 1949
Magazines disestablished in 1955